Arthur John Duckworth (born 19 January 1949) is a former Australian rules footballer who played for  in the Victorian Football League (VFL),  in the West Australian National Football League (WANFL), and  in the South Australian National Football League (SANFL). He is the older brother of former  footballer Billy Duckworth.

Born in Western Australia, Duckworth started his football career in Victoria with Fitzroy. He had been in Melbourne due to National Service training and after approaching Fitzroy found himself recruited for the 1970 season. Duckworth played 11 games that year but did not play again until 1974 as a result of both his military commitments and a stint in Vietnam. His last VFL season was in 1976 and the following year he returned to Western Australia where he joined West Perth. He played 44 games over two years, during this time he represented his state at interstate football.

In 1979 he was picked up by SANFL club Central District and in his debut season won the Magarey Medal, topped the club's goalkicking and played interstate football for his second state. A ruptured kidney at the start of the 1980 season kept him out for most of the year and at the end of the season he decided to return to West Perth to finish his career. He played 42 games for Central District and finished with a total of 120 games for West Perth. John was known as the longest kick seen in VFL and was regularly seen to kick over 80 metres including one at Waverley of over 90 metres. The pack would stand too close to John and then turn and run after the ball.

External links

 Central District profile
Service Record on Nominal Roll of Vietnam Veterans

Fitzroy Football Club players
West Perth Football Club players
Central District Football Club players
Magarey Medal winners
Australian military personnel of the Vietnam War
1949 births
Living people
Australian rules footballers from Western Australia
People from Lake Grace, Western Australia